, better known by his stage name Kreva, is a Japanese rapper and record producer signed with the Burger Inn Records and Pony Canyon's Knife Edge labels. He is a solo artist as well as a member of various hip hop groups, including Kick the Can Crew, By Phar the Dopest with fellow MC Cuezero, and a large ensemble of other Japanese hip hop groups in Funky Grammar Unit.

His stage name is derived from the English word "clever".

Music career
In September 2011, Kreva released his fifth album, Go. The album charted at number 2 on the Oricon weekly charts. Following the release of the album, Kreva began his first tour in two years, known as "Kreva Concert Tour 2012: Go". In June 2012, Kreva released his single "Oh Yeah!", which charted at number 8 on the Oricon weekly charts.

In 2014, Kreva adapted lyrics for the Japanese production of Broadway musical In the Heights. Following the success of the 2014 production, the musical was revived for an encore run in 2021.

Discography

Studio albums
  (2004)
  (2006)
  (2007)
  (2009)
 Go (2011)
 Space (2013)
  (2017)

Extended plays
 Oasys (2010)

Compilation albums
  (2008)
 Japanese Rap Star for USA, Vol. 1 (2011)
 BEST ALBUM「KX」(2014)

Remix albums
 Best of MixCD No. 1 (2007)
 Best of MixCD No. 2 (2012)

Singles
  (2004)
  (2004)
  (2004)
  feat. Mummy-D (2005)
  (2005)
  (2005)
  (2005)
 "Have a Nice Day!" (2006)
 "The Show" (2006)
  (2007)
  (featuring Masamune Kusano) (2007)
  (2007)
 "Magic" (with Toshinobu Kubota) (2007)
  (2009)
 "I Wanna Know You" (2009)
  (featuring Yuu Sakai) (2009)
 "Nothing" (2009)
  (2009)
  (2009)
  (2009)
  (Toko Furuuchi and Kreva) (2009)
  (2011)
 "C'mon, Let's Go" (2011)
 "Kila Kila" (2011)
 "Tan-Kyu-Shin" (2011)
 "Strong" (Miyavi vs Kreva) (2011)
  (2012)
 "Oh Yeah!" (2012)
 "Na Na Na" (2012)
  (2013)
  (2014)
 "Under The Moon" (2015)

DVDs
  (2006)
  (2007)
  (2008)
  (2008)
 MTV Unplugged Kreva (2008)
  (2009)
  (2010)
  (2012)

Filmography
461 Days of Bento: A Promise Between Father and Son (2020)

Awards and nominations

|-
| 2003
| (with Kick The Can Crew)
| MTV Video Music Awards Japan: Best Live Performance
| 
|-
| rowspan=2|2004
| Saga Continue (with Kick The Can Crew)
| MTV Video Music Awards Japan: Best Group Video
| 
|-
| (with Kick The Can Crew)
| MTV Video Music Awards Japan: Best Website
| 
|-
| rowspan=2|2005
| I'm Not Alone
| MTV Video Music Awards Japan: Best Male Video
| 
|-
| Funky Glamorous
| MTV Video Music Awards Japan: Best Hip Hop Video
| 
|-
| 2006
| Issai Gassai
| MTV Video Music Awards Japan: Best Hip Hop Video
| 
|-
| rowspan=2|2007
| The Show
| MTV Video Music Awards Japan: Best Hip Hop Video
| 
|-
| The Show
| MTV Video Music Awards Japan: Best Male Video
| 
|-
| rowspan=2|2008
| Strong Style
| MTV Video Music Awards Japan: Best Hip Hop Video
| 
|-
| Magic
| MTV Video Music Awards Japan: Best Collaboration Video
| 
|-
| rowspan=2|2009
| 
| MTV Video Music Awards Japan: Best Male Video
| 
|-
| 
| MTV Video Music Awards Japan: Best Hip Hop Video
| 
|-
| rowspan=2|2010
| Speechless
| MTV Video Music Awards Japan: Best Male Video
| 
|-
| Speechless
| MTV Video Music Awards Japan: Best Hip Hop Video
| 
|-
| 2012
| 
| MTV Video Music Awards Japan: Best Hip Hop Video
| 
|}

References

External links
 
 
 Kreva at Discogs

1976 births
Living people
Japanese hip hop musicians
Japanese-language singers
Japanese record producers
Japanese male singer-songwriters
Japanese singer-songwriters
Pony Canyon artists
21st-century Japanese singers
21st-century Japanese male singers